Barriga de Aluguel (English: Belly Rent) is a Brazilian telenovela produced and broadcast by Rede Globo between 20 August 1990 and 31 May 1991 in 243 episodes. It was created by Glória Perez in collaboration with Leila Míccolis and directed by Wolf Maya.

Cast

Supporting cast

International releases 
Barriga de Aluguel was aired in over 30 countries, among them:

References

External links 
 

1990 telenovelas
Brazilian telenovelas
1990 Brazilian television series debuts
1991 Brazilian television series endings
TV Globo telenovelas
Television shows set in Rio de Janeiro (city)
Medical telenovelas
Telenovelas by Glória Perez
Portuguese-language telenovelas